Bathymophila alabida is a species of sea snail, a marine gastropod mollusk in the family Solariellidae.

Description
The size of the shell attains .

Distribution
This marine species occurs off New Zealand (off the Three Kings Rise and the Kermadec Ridge) and New Caledonia.

References

 Marshall, B.A. 1979: The Trochidae and Turbinidae of the Kermadec Ridge (Mollusca: Gastropoda). New Zealand Journal of Zoology 6: 521-552 (p. 532)
 Marshall, B.A. 1999: A revision of the Recent Solariellinae (Gastropoda: Trochoidea) of the New Zealand region. The Nautilus 113: 4-42 (p. 24)

External links
 To Biodiversity Heritage Library (1 publication)
 To World Register of Marine Species
 

alabida
Gastropods described in 1979